Vittorio Monti (6 January 186820 June 1922) was an Italian composer, violinist,  mandolinist and conductor. His most famous work is his Csárdás, written around 1904 and played by almost every Romani orchestra.

Monti was born in Naples, where he studied violin and composition at the Conservatorio di San Pietro a Majella. Around 1900 he received an assignment as the conductor for the Lamoureux Orchestra in Paris, where he wrote several ballets and operettas, for example, Noël de Pierrot.  He also wrote a method for mandolin Petite Méthode pour Mandoline, 98049, in which he included some of his own works, Perle Brillante, Dans Una Gondola, and Au Petit Jour. There were also works by F. Paolo Tosti.

In Paris, Monti was a significant figure in the Mandolin community, he created the La Stella, a group based around mandolin and guitar works and compositions. This group (under the name of "V. Monti") written several pieces and techniques for mandolin students, and started performances in 1908 to 1910. In 1910, Monti created a music journal called Le Mediator, the journal gave news and instructional guidance to help new mandolin and guitar players. However, this journal dissolved in 1913.

References

External links
Csárdás for Violin and Piano on www.kreusch-sheet-music.net
Csárdás arranged for accordion
Czárdás arranged for string quartet 
Csárdás for Violin and Guitar on 
 
 Vittorio Monti sheet music: contemporary arrangements

1868 births
1922 deaths
19th-century classical composers
19th-century classical violinists
19th-century conductors (music)
20th-century classical composers
20th-century classical violinists
20th-century Italian composers
20th-century Italian conductors (music)
20th-century Italian male musicians
Italian classical composers
Italian classical mandolinists
Italian classical violinists
Italian male classical composers
Italian male conductors (music)
Italian Romantic composers
Male classical violinists
Musicians from Naples